Allesø is a village and northwestern suburb of Odense, Funen, Denmark.

References

Suburbs of Odense
Populated places in Funen
Odense Municipality